Craig Blythman (born ) is an Australian male weightlifter, competing in the 77 kg category and representing Australia at international competitions. He competed at world championships, most recently at the 1999 World Weightlifting Championships.

Major results

References

1970 births
Living people
Australian male weightlifters
Place of birth missing (living people)
Weightlifters at the 2002 Commonwealth Games
Commonwealth Games medallists in weightlifting
Commonwealth Games bronze medallists for Australia
20th-century Australian people
21st-century Australian people
Medallists at the 2002 Commonwealth Games